Qi Wei (born 26 October 1985), also known as Stephy Qi, is a Chinese singer and actress.

Career
Qi debuted as a singer after participating in the talent program My Show, and formed a duo with Yuan Chengjie. The duo rose to fame with the song Wai Tan Shi Ba Hao (外滩十八号), which won the "Best Duet" award at the Global Chinese Music Awards.

Thereafter, Qi ventured into acting and became known to audiences after starring in historical drama Beauty's Rival in Palace in 2010. In 2011, she signed a contract with Ocean Butterflies International and released her debut album If Love Forgets. The same year, she also starred in the highly rated drama My Daughter and released a soundtrack for the series. Qi is also known for starring in modern suspense drama Unbeatable (2010), romantic comedy drama Love Wakes Up (2011) and gongan fiction series Young Sherlock (2014). Qi won the Most Popular Actress award at the China TV Drama Awards.

After her short hiatus for childbirth, Qi returned to the screen with modern romance drama I Am DuLala in 2015. In 2016, she was cast in John Woo's action thriller film, Manhunt.

Personal life 
In 2014, Qi married Korean-American actor Lee Seung-hyun in Las Vegas. Their baby daughter named Lucky was born in January 2015.

Discography

Albums

Singles

Filmography

Film

Television series

Variety show

Awards and nominations

References

Living people
1984 births
Actresses from Chengdu
Chinese film actresses
Chinese television actresses
Chinese pop singers
Singers from Chengdu
21st-century Chinese actresses
21st-century Chinese women singers